A. Anwhar Raajhaa (b. 1949) is an Indian politician and served as a Member of Parliament elected from Tamil Nadu. He was elected to the 16th Lok Sabha from Ramanathapuram constituency as an Anna Dravida Munnetra Kazhagam candidate in 2014 election. Previously, he served as Minister of Labour and Employment from 2001 to 2006. From 1986 to 1991, he served as Chairman of Mandabam Panchayat Union. 
During his time as Parliamentarian,  he served in various committees such as House Committee, External affairs, Minority affairs etc. In addition he served as the Member of Tamil Nadu Wakf Borad.

He got expelled from ADMK party on 30 November, 2021 citing activities against party principles.

References 

All India Anna Dravida Munnetra Kazhagam politicians
Living people
India MPs 2014–2019
Lok Sabha members from Tamil Nadu
1949 births
People from Ramanathapuram district